Jeanna Petyarre (b. 1950), also known as Jeannie Petyarre, is a member of a family of artists that includes Kathleen Petyarre, Ada Bird Petyarre and Emily Kame Kngwarreye. Jeanna Petyarre is from the Utopia district of Central Australia.  Her works feature in a number of collections including the National Gallery of Australia in Canberra, and the Holmes à Court Collection in Perth, as well as many private collections.

Exhibitions 
Exhibitions include:

 1989 Utopia Women's Paintings the first works on canvas
 1990 A Picture Story exhibition of 88 works on silk from the Holmes a Court Collection by Utopian artists which toured Eire and Scotland
 1993 Central Australian Aboriginal Art and Craft Exhibition, Araluen Centre, Alice Springs; 2005 Cicada Trading, Illayda, Istanbul, Turkey
 2005 Cicada Trading, Milan, Italy
 2006 Cicada Trading, Dubai, United Arab Emirates; 2006 Cicada Trading, Annual Clear Lake Exhibition of Aboriginal Paintings, Houston, USA
 2006 Cicada Trading, Paris, France
 2006 Cicada Trading, Bahrain Art Society, the Kingdom of Bahrain
 2006 Cicada Trading, Abu Dhabi, United Arab Emirates

References 

1950 births
Living people
Artists from the Northern Territory
Australian Aboriginal artists
20th-century Australian artists
21st-century Australian artists
20th-century Australian women artists
21st-century Australian women artists